Faded Love is a compilation album released by American country music artist, Patsy Cline. The album was released in 1988 under MCA Records and was produced by Allen Reynolds and Don Williams. It was the second compilation MCA released in 1988.

Background 
Faded Love is a ten-track collection of songs by Patsy Cline under her second record label, Decca Records. The songs varied from Country and Pop music standards such as the title track and "Anytime," as well as previously unrecorded material such as "Imagine That" and "When You Need a Laugh." The album's title track originally peaked at #7 on the Billboard Magazine Hot Country Songs chart and #96 on the Billboard Pop Chart in 1963. In addition "He Called Me Baby" peaked at #23 on the Billboard Country Chart in 1964. The album was issued on a compact disc at the time of its release. In 1995, the album was reissued on Universal Special Products.
Faded Love was on the first Patsy Cline MCA compilations to ever be released on a CD instead of a record.

Track listing

Personnel 
 Byron Bach – cello
 Brenton Banks – violin
 George Binkly III – violin
 Harold Bradley – electric bass
 John Bright – viola
 Cecil Brower – viola
 Howard Carpenter – violin
 Patsy Cline – lead vocals
 Floyd Cramer – organ
 Ray Edenton – rhythm guitar
 Walter Haynes – steel guitar
 Buddy Harman – drums
 Randy Hughes – acoustic guitar
 The Jordanaires – background vocals
 Lillian Hunt – violin
 Martin Kathan – violin
 Grady Martin – electric guitar
 Wayne Moss – electric bass
 Bob Moore – double bass
 Suzanne Parker – violin
 Bill Pursell – organ
 Verne Richardson – violin
 Hargus "Pig" Robbins – piano
 Gary Williams – violin

References 

Patsy Cline albums
1988 compilation albums